Stolpersteine is the German name for stumbling blocks collocated all over Europe by German artist Gunter Demnig. They remember the fate of the victims of Nazi Germany being murdered, deported, exiled or driven to suicide. The first Stolperstein collocations in the Banskobystrický kraj, the Banská Bystrica Region of present-day Slovakia (formerly Czechoslovakia), took place in Banská Bystrica and in Brezno on 31 October 2012.

The inscriptions in Fiľakovo and Tornaľa are in both Hungarian and Slovak as there both languages are spoken. Generally, the stumbling blocks are posed in front of the building where the victims had their last self chosen residence. The name of the Stolpersteine in Slovak is pamätné kamene, memorial stones, in Hungarian botlatókő, stumbling stones.

The lists are sortable; the basic order follows the alphabet according to the last name of the victim.

Banská Bystrica

Brezno

Fiľakovo

Halič

Lučenec

Ratková

Tornaľa

These lists make no claims to be complete.

Dates of collocations 
According to the website of Gunter Demnig the Stolpersteine the Banskobystrický kraj were posed by the artist himself on the following days: 
 31 October 2012: Banská Bystrica, Brezno (Námestie generála Štefánika 49)
 22 July 2013: Banská Bystrica, Halič
 18 September 2014: Banská Bystrica, Lučenec, Ratková
 7 August 2015: Brezno (Československej armády 2298/59), Tornaľa
 8 August 2015: Banská Bystrica (Horná Ulica 23)
 8 August 2016: Banská Bystrica (Dolnej Ulica 6), Fiľakovo
 23 September 2017: Banská Bystrica (Horná Ulica 51 and 55), Brezno (Námestie generála Štefánika 49)

See also 
 List of cities by country that have stolpersteine
 Stolpersteine in Slovakia

External links

 stolpersteine.eu, Demnig's website
 Yad Vashem, Central Database of Shoah Victims' Names

References

Banská Bystrica Region
Stolpersteine
Holocaust commemoration